The Edgewood Place Historic District is a residential historic district located in La Crosse, Wisconsin, United States. It was added to the National Register of Historic Places in 2010.

History
The district is a somewhat secluded neighborhood of period revival homes built from 1935 to 1940, in a variety of 20th Century styles, including the 1937 Colonial Revival Orton house, the 1937 Tudor Revival Wittich house, and the 1940 Art Moderne Denzer house.

References

Geography of La Crosse County, Wisconsin
Houses on the National Register of Historic Places in Wisconsin
Houses in La Crosse County, Wisconsin
Historic districts on the National Register of Historic Places in Wisconsin
National Register of Historic Places in La Crosse County, Wisconsin